Kjeldsen is a surname. Notable people with the surname include:

Berno Kjeldsen, Danish diplomat
Erik Kjeldsen (1890–1976), Danish cyclist
Mark Kjeldsen, founder member of The Sinceros and former member of the London R&B band, The Strutters
Michael Kjeldsen (born 1962), Danish badminton player 
Søren Kjeldsen (born 1975), Danish golfer
Tinne Hoff Kjeldsen, Danish mathematician
 See also
 Royal Dansk, in 1990 it merged with another biscuit company, Kjeldsen

Danish-language surnames